Zinc finger protein 8 is a protein that in humans is encoded by the ZNF8 gene.

References

Further reading